Koodal Nagar is a 2007 Indian Tamil-language drama film directed by first-timer Seenu Ramasamy. The film stars Bharath in dual lead roles with Sandhya and Bhavana  The film opened in 5 April 2007 to negative reviews and was declared as below average at the box office.

Plot

The story is set in a suburb of Madurai. Suryan and Chandran (both played by Bharath) are twins.  Suryan, the elder of the two, is a soft-spoken guy who works at a local lending library and falls in love with Manimekalai(Bhavana), the daughter of Namasivayam (Mahadevan), the local politician-don and MLA. Chandran, the younger one, works as a mortuary assistant in the local government hospital, and he is one among Namasivayam's bad guys who are in charge of his election campaign. Chandran is romantically linked to a local girl named Tamizhselvi (Sandhya). Namasivayam learns of his daughter's love affair with Suryan and orders to some killers to kill Suryan. However, they accidentally attack Chandran, who succeeds in escaping from them. Later, Chandran visits Manimekalai and requests her to forget his brother. Nevertheless, she plans to elope with Suryan. They go away and wait for the bus. Once the bus arrives, Suryan approaches it, only to be struck by a knife in the head. Namasivayam's goons have gotten to know about the plan and have come to kill Suryan. They take Manimekalai and leave. Chandran is later shocked to learn that the dead body which came into the mortuary for preparation for burial is none other than his own brother. Enraged by this, he cycles to Namasivayam's house to kill him. But their gardener prevents him from doing anything brash. Chandran later goes to an out-of-town lodge where Namasivayam stays. His goons check Chandran thoroughly and let him go up to meet Namasivayam. He cries in front of Namasivayam saying their political opponents have killed his brother, mistaking for himself. Namasivayam pretends to call the police and a judge to sort things out. Chandran then leaves, and the next day, Namasivayam goes to the mortuary to pay respect to Suryan's body. Once he is in the "body", he gets up and kills Namasivayam and two of his goons. It is Chandran, who acted like the dead body of his brother, and Tamizhselvi helps him by closing the doors of the mortuary and not letting the other goons in. All the women who were flocked to the scene hit the other goons and chase them away. Later, it is seen that both Chandran and Tamizhselvi are arrested by the police.

Cast

Bharath as Suriyan and Chandran (dual role)
Sandhya as Tamizhselvi
Bhavana as Manimekalai
Mahadevan as Namasivayam
Ilavarasu
Meera Krishnan
Periya Karuppu Thevar
Manobala as Doctor
Thennavan
Indhu
 Bava Lakshmanan
Cheran Raj
Vaigai Balan
Theni Murugan
Seenu Ramasamy as Bus Conductor (cameo appearance)

Production
Production work for the film began in late 2004, with Sandhya signed up to portray a role even before the release of her first film, Kadhal (2004).

Songs
The songs are composed by Sabesh–Murali.

 1: Tamil Selvi Tamil Selvi - Hariharan, Sadhana Sargam
 2: Vaarrar Ayya Vaarraru - Thulasidhas
 3: Yaarathu Yaarathu -  Haricharan, Swetha
 4: Yakka Nillukka - Karthik
5: Aayiram Thalaiyapaathu - Tippu
 6: Kaalgal Munnalae - Chandre

References

External links
 

2007 films
Films shot in Madurai
Twins in Indian films
2000s Tamil-language films
2007 directorial debut films
Films directed by Seenu Ramasamy